Pandorum is a 2009 German/British science fiction horror film, with elements of survival adventure. The film was directed by Christian Alvart and produced by Robert Kulzer, Jeremy Bolt and Paul W. S. Anderson, the latter two through their Impact Pictures banner. Travis Milloy wrote the screenplay from a story by Milloy and Alvart. It stars Dennis Quaid and Ben Foster.

Filming began in Berlin in August 2008. Pandorum was released on 25 September 2009 in the United States, and on 2 October 2009 in the UK. The film's title is a fictional slang term for a form of psychosis called Orbital Dysfunctional Syndrome (ODS) caused by deep space and triggered by emotional stress. This leads to severe paranoia, delirium, and nosebleeding.

The film was poorly received and a box office flop.

Plot 

After human overpopulation depletes Earth's resources, humanity builds an interstellar ark, the Elysium. It carries 60,000 people on a 123-year trip to colonize Tanis, an Earth-like planet. The passengers are placed in hypersleep, and a rotating crew wake biennially to maintain the ship. Eight years into the mission, the ship receives a transmission from Earth: "You're all that's left of us. Good luck, God bless, and godspeed."

Some unknown time later, two members of the flight crew, Corporal Bower and Lieutenant Payton, awaken. Improper emergence from the hibernatory state leaves them both with partial amnesia and possibly suffering from pandorum, a space-related disorder that causes psychosis when under emotional duress. The ship experiences power surges caused by an unstable nuclear reactor, and they are unable to enter the bridge. While Payton stays behind to access the ship's computer, Bower uses the ventilation system to search for the reactor.

Bower first finds a disemboweled body and a wounded mechanic who tells him to escape "them". The noise summons a group of cannibalistic humanoids who appear to respond mostly to sound. He continues on and encounters an environmental scientist, Nadia, and a farmer, Manh, who does not speak English; both are hostile. He encourages them to band together, and the trio flees into a barricaded chamber, where they find a cook named Leland. Leland has been awake for years, living off the water leaking into the ship, the algae it creates, and resorting to cannibalism. Payton encounters Corporal Gallo, who claims the ship is lost in space and that he killed his team in self-defense.

Leland feeds Bower's group and shows them mural drawings depicting what has happened: after Earth vanished following an unknown catastrophe, Gallo went insane, killed his crew, and induced pandorum in other passengers. After goading them into a violent and tribal culture, Gallo went back into hypersleep. Aided by accelerated evolution from an enzyme meant to help colonists adjust to life on Tanis, the descendants have turned into cannibalistic mutants. Leland gasses the group, intending to eat them, but Bower convinces him the reactor must be stabilized.

As they search the ship for the reactor, Bower hopes to find his wife in an area for family in hypersleep but remembers that she died with everyone else on Earth when she refused to join him.  This revelation almost makes him give up and pushes him closer to insanity. After surviving an encounter with the cannibals, Bower's group finds the reactor. A crowd of mutants sleep under the reactor, and Bower crosses a walkway to reset it. The walkway collapses, and Bower climbs down into the mutant pit to reach a ladder. While Manh distracts the mutants, Bower restarts the reactor, killing many mutants.  Leland flees, and Manh is cornered by the mutant leader. Manh kills the leader but is killed by a mutant child he hesitates to slay.

Gallo becomes increasingly agitated, and Payton prepares a sedative. As they wrestle over the sedative, Gallo is revealed to be a hallucination as Payton IS Gallo. Gallo killed the real Payton long ago when he developed pandorum upon hearing Earth was gone. Because he went into Payton's pod, Gallo mistakenly believed himself to be Payton when he woke up with amnesia. Leland reaches the bridge, and Gallo kills him with the sedative. When Bower and Nadia confront him, Gallo opens the shutters on the bridge's windows, revealing that the ship is adrift in deep space with no stars visible. The shock pushes Bower further toward insanity. Taking advantage of Bower's mental state, Gallo argues they must maintain the violent society rather than revive civilization.

Nadia observes bioluminescent ocean life through the windows, and the computer displays that 923 years have elapsed since the mission launched. The ship reached Tanis 800 years ago and landed itself in the ocean. Bower hallucinates a mutant attack and breaks a window. As water pours into the ship, Nadia and Bower climb into a hypersleep pod and eject it. The flood triggers an emergency protocol which ejects the remaining 1,211 pods to the surface, while Gallo and the remaining mutants drown. Bower and Nadia surface near a lush coastline, and they witness the other pods ascend.

Cast 
 Dennis Quaid as Lieutenant Payton/Older Corporal Gallo – The Ship's Lieutenant and captain, later revealed to be Corporal Gallo
 Ben Foster as Corporal Bower – The ship's Corporal and presumed head mechanical engineer
 Cam Gigandet as Younger Corporal Gallo – A Corporal who went insane and killed his team, and believed himself to be Payton throughout most of the movie
 Antje Traue as Nadia – the ship's environmentalist, who teams with Bower 
 Cung Le as Manh – an agricultural farmer, who teams with Bower and Nadia
 Eddie Rouse as Leland – the mentally unstable cook who has resorted to cannibalism. 
 André Hennicke as hunter leader – leader of the Hunters
 Norman Reedus as Shepard – a mechanic whom Bower encounters
 Wotan Wilke Möhring as Young Bower's Father
 Niels-Bruno Schmidt as Insane Officer Eden

Production 
The film began life as a preliminary script written by Travis Milloy in the late 1990s. The story was originally set on a prison ship named Pandorum, transporting thousands of Earth's deadliest prisoners to another planet; the cannibal hunters were the end result of the prisoners' degeneration. The characters played by Antje Traue and Cung Le were inmates. Ben Foster's character was a non-prisoner who did not trust anyone.

Believing no studio would want to make the film, Milloy thought about making it as a low-budget film shot on video in an abandoned paper mill with unknown actors. However, it attracted the attention of filmmaker Paul W. S. Anderson and Jeremy Bolt, and they gave it to Impact Pictures, who green-lit it. The producers gave the script to director Christian Alvart who was struck by the similarities to his own screenplay titled No Where. His dramatic story was about four astronauts aboard a settlers' ship who suffer from amnesia. Alvart decided that they should meld the two screenplays together, and the producers and Milloy agreed. With the ship now changed to a settler's ship, the use of the word "Pandorum" was changed from the name of the ship to a type of mental illness caused by sustained deep space travel.

Pandorum was announced in May 2008 with Dennis Quaid and Ben Foster in lead roles. Christian Alvart was attached to direct the film, based on a script by Travis Milloy. The movie was financed by Constantin Film through a joint venture deal with subsidiary Impact Pictures. The partnership helped fund the $40 million production. The German Federal Film Fund provided $6 million to the production, the fund's second-largest 2008 payout after $7.5 million for Ninja Assassin. Filming took place at Babelsberg Studios in Potsdam, Germany in August 2008.

Release 

Summit Entertainment handled foreign sales and presented Pandorum to buyers at the 2009 Cannes Film Festival, but due to a deal with Contender Films in the UK, Metro-Goldwyn-Mayer Pictures took over and handled foreign sales to the film. Overture Films distributed Pandorum in North America, Icon in the United Kingdom and Australia, Svensk Filmindustri in Scandinavia, and Movie Eye in Japan. The film was set up as a possible franchise. According to Travis Milloy, it was to have a sequel and a prequel. If it performed well, Impact Pictures could green-light one or more sequels.

The DVD and Blu-ray Disc release occurred on 19 January 2010 in the United States over Anchor Bay Entertainment.

The director and producer commentaries on the DVD indicate that an unrated version of the movie exists but has not been released.

Reception 
The website's critical consensus reads, "While it might prove somewhat satisfying for devout sci-fi fans, Pandorum's bloated, derivative plot ultimately leaves it drifting in space." At Metacritic, which judges on a 0–100 scale, the film holds a "generally unfavorable" score of 28 based on 13 reviews.

Science fiction magazine SFX stated that "Pandorum is the finest interstellar horror in years" and awarded the film 4 stars out of 5. Film Ireland also gave Pandorum a positive review, appreciating the film's synergy of cinematic techniques, set design, and developed characters.

The film was a flop, grossing $20.6 million worldwide on a $33 million budget. It opened at No. 6 at the US box office with weekend receipts totaling $4.4 million. Overture Films declared bankruptcy the following year.

Soundtrack 

Track listing
 "All That Is Left of Us" (2:43)
 "Pandorum" (3:58)
 "Anti Riot" (4:17)
 "Shape" (2:03)
 "Hunting Party" (2:48)
 "Kulzer Complex" (4:40)
 "Tanis Probe Broadcast" (2:01)
 "Scars" (2:20)
 "Fucking Solidarity" (3:28)
 "Gallo's Birth" (2:22)
 "Biolab Attack" (2:25)
 "Kanyrna" (3:22)
 "The Stars All Look Alike" (4:32)
 "Boom" (3:55)
 "Reactor" (4:08)
 "Skin on Skin" (3:21)
 "Fight Fight Fight" (2:56)
 "Bower's Trip" (7:51)
 "Discovery / End Credits" (7:55)

See also 
Survivalism in fiction
Malthusianism
Psychological and sociological effects of spaceflight

References

External links 

 
 
 

2009 films
2009 horror films
2009 independent films
2000s science fiction horror films
2009 psychological thriller films
British psychological thriller films
British independent films
British science fiction horror films
German psychological thriller films
German independent films
German science fiction horror films
English-language German films
Films directed by Christian Alvart
Films produced by Paul W. S. Anderson
British action horror films
Films set on fictional planets
Space adventure films
Films set in the 31st century
D-Box motion-enhanced films
Underwater action films
Overture Films films
Summit Entertainment films
Constantin Film films
Films shot in Germany
Babelsberg Studio films
Generation ships in fiction
Films about cannibalism
Overpopulation fiction
Films about dissociative identity disorder
Films set in outer space
Films set on spacecraft
2000s English-language films
2000s British films
2000s German films